Grootfonteinite is a rare lead carbonate mineral with the relatively simple formula Pb3O(CO3)2. It is one of number of minerals discovered on in the Kombat mine, Grootfontein district, Namibia.

Relation to other minerals
Grootfonteinite is structurally related to hydrocerussite and plumbonacrite.

External links
 Grootfonteinite on Mindat:

References

Carbonate minerals
Lead minerals
Hexagonal minerals
Minerals in space group 186